White Sulphur Springs National Fish Hatchery is a U.S. Fish and Wildlife Service facility located along the historic Midland Trail in the Allegheny Highlands of southeast West Virginia. Established in 1900 to produce fish for the American Public, this fish hatchery became part of the National Broadstock Program in 1976. Since that date, this hatchery has been shipping millions of healthy rainbow trout eggs to hatcheries across the country.

Mission 
White Sulphur Springs National Fish Hatchery has as its goal to work with the community and its partners to be good stewards of the environment. They provide recreational fishing opportunities, recover fish, mussels, and other wildlife, and promote awareness and appreciation of cultural and natural resources.

Freshwater Mussel Conservation 
Added to the hatchery in 1995, this program works toward the restoration of freshwater mussel populations. A spill of a hazardous substance on the Ohio River near Marietta, Ohio killed an estimated 1,000,000 freshwater mussels. Today, White Sulphur Springs National Fish Hatchery provides shelter for mussels endangered by pollution and ships baby mussels to improve wild populations.

Freshwater Folk Festival 
The Freshwater Folk Festival [1] is hosted by the Friends of the White Sulphur Springs National Fish Hatchery [2] on the first Saturday of October every year. This began on October 2, 2004, and is designed to be a family-friendly day of music, food, crafts, and educational opportunities. It is hoped the festival promotes understanding, appreciation, and conservation of freshwater resources, and celebrates the local natural history of White Sulphur Springs and Greenbrier County.

Annual Fishing Derby 
The White Sulphur Springs Annual Fishing Derby is held on the Saturday of Memorial Day weekend, providing an opportunity for children and their families to spend the day fishing for rainbow trout. The Annual Fishing Derby has been celebrated for over 20 years; it is co-hosted by the White Sulphur Springs Rotary Club.

References

External links
 White Sulphur Springs National Fish Hatchery (Official site)

1990 establishments in West Virginia
Buildings and structures in Greenbrier County, West Virginia
National Fish Hatcheries of the United States
Tourist attractions in Greenbrier County, West Virginia
White Sulphur Springs, West Virginia
Agricultural buildings and structures in West Virginia